Professor Ruth Lapidoth (born October 27, 1930) is a Senior Researcher at the Jerusalem Institute for Israel Studies and Professor Emeritus of International Law at the Hebrew University of Jerusalem. She is a recipient of the 2006 Israel Prize in Legal Studies and of the 2000 Prominent Woman in International Law Award from the WILIG group of the American Society of International Law.

Lapidoth formerly served as a Legal Advisor to the Ministry of Foreign Affairs, has been a guest lecturer and researcher in several leading academic institutions, including Oxford University, Georgetown University and the American Institute for Peace, and is the author of nine books and more than ninety articles dealing with international law, human rights, the Arab–Israeli conflict, and Jerusalem.

Lapidoth serves as a member of the Advisory Board of the Israel Council on Foreign Relations.

References

1930 births
Living people
Academic staff of the Hebrew University of Jerusalem
Academic staff of the College of Management Academic Studies
Israel Prize in law recipients
Israeli women academics
International law scholars

Israeli legal scholars